The Ultimate Collection is the third "best-of" compilation album and by Bosnian rock band Zabranjeno Pušenje, released on March 18, 2009. The double-full-length album is released through Croatia Records.

Track listing
Source: Croatia Records, Discogs

Personnel 
Credits adapted from the album's liner notes.

Production
  Klaudija Čular – editing (Sony DADC in Salzburg, Austria)
 Želimir Babogredac – production

Design
Igor Kelčec – design

References

2009 compilation albums
2009 greatest hits albums
Zabranjeno Pušenje albums